Julia O'Faolain (6 June 1932 – 27 October 2020) was a London-born Irish novelist and short story writer. Her parents were Irish writers Seán Ó Faoláin and Eileen Gould.

Biography
She was educated at University College Dublin, Sapienza University of Rome and the Sorbonne Paris. She worked as a writer, language teacher, editor and translator and lived in France, Italy, and the United States. Her novels include Godded and Codded (1970), Women In The Wall (1975), No Country for Young Men (1980), The Obedient Wife (1982), The Irish Signorina (1984), The Judas Cloth (1992) and Adam Gould (2009). Her short story collections include We Might See Sights! (1968), Man in the Cellar (1974), Melancholy Baby (1978) and Daughters of Passion (1982). As Julia Martines, she translated Two Memoirs of Renaissance Florence: The Diaries of Buonaccorso Pitti and Gregorio Dati and Piero Chiara's A Man of Parts. Her No Country for Young Men was shortlisted for the 1980 Booker Prize.

She lived in Los Angeles, where she was married to historian of the Renaissance, Lauro Martines. They had one son. With her husband she co-edited Not in God's Image: Women in History from the Greeks to the Victorians (1973).

O'Faolain died on 27 October 2020, aged 88.

Reviews
 Watson, George (1980), review of No Country for Young Men, in Cencrastus No. 4, Winter 1980-81, p. 48,

References

1932 births
2020 deaths
Fellows of the Royal Society of Literature
Irish women novelists
Irish women short story writers
20th-century Irish short story writers
20th-century Irish women writers
20th-century Irish novelists